Cioffi may refer to :

Claudio Cioffi (born 7 May 1951), also Claudio Cioffi-Revilla, is an Italian-American scientist and inventor, best known for his work in applied mathematics and computational social science.
Charles Cioffi (born 31 October 1935), also credited as Charles M. Cioffi, is an American television actor.
Felippe Cioffi (fl. 1828–1846) was trombone soloist in the 19th century.
 Frank Cioffi, an American philosopher
Gabriele Cioffi (born 30 September 1975 in Florence) is an Italian footballer who plays for Serie B team Ascoli in the role of a defender.
John Cioffi (born 7 November 1956), also credited as John M. Cioffi, is an American electrical engineer and prolific inventor best known for his work in DSL technology.
Landulf Cioffi was a Knight crusader and Lord of Salerno, Italy, after the fall of Acre. Library of the Province of Salerno.
Ralph Cioffi was an executive at the U.S. investment bank Bear Stearns and managed two Bear-branded hedge funds. 
Sandy Cioffi is a Seattle-based film and video artist.
Mauro Cioffi, Italian footballer